Mount Grenfell Historic Site is an Aboriginal rock art site, about 40 kilometres northwest of Cobar (about 70km driving distance, of which the last 30km are over a dirt road off the Barrier Highway), in the arid lands in central west New South Wales, Australia. It is a spiritually important place for its Aboriginal owners, the Ngiyampaa Wangaaypuwan people. Hundreds of ancient rock drawings of humans, animals and the natural environment can be found at this historically invaluable site.

On 17 July 2004, the site was handed back by the Australian government to the Ngiyampaa Wangaaypuwan people, but is leased back to the NSW government.

Many animal species live here. There are emus, kangaroos, bearded dragons, geckos, and there is also the endangered jerboa or the so-called as mouse that hops.

References

External links
Photos of Mount Grenfell Historic Site by Paul Dudley

Grenfell
Protected areas of New South Wales
Rock art in Australia